Passiflora luzmarina is a species of plant in the family Passifloraceae. It is endemic to Ecuador.

References

luzmarina
Endemic flora of Ecuador
Endangered plants
Taxonomy articles created by Polbot